Jason "Singer" Smith is a professional American rock climber. 

In 2000, Islamic guerrilla fighters kidnapped mountain climbers Beth Rodden, Tommy Caldwell, Jason "Singer" Smith, and John Dickey in the mountains of Kyrgyzstan during a mountain expedition.

References

Year of birth missing (living people)
Living people
American rock climbers
Place of birth missing (living people)